Greg Haberny (born 1975) is an American artist and filmmaker based in New York.

Haberny's artist residencies include The Fountainhead Residency and McColl Center for Art + Innovation.

In 2016, Haberny held an exhibition called 'Py•r•o·glyph•s' at the Catinca Tabacaru Gallery in New York. His works for this exhibition were based on the process of burning his old artworks and creating new ones from the ashes.

References

External links 

Living people
People from New York (state)
American filmmakers
American artists
1975 births